Christina Erikson, née Granbom, (born 22 February 1973 in Högsby) is a Swedish crime-author. She is also a surgery-nurse and she has a degree in media and communication science.

Career
Erikson released her first book in 2014 with the book Morsarvet, and the year after she released the book En god gärning.

In 2015, she released the book Av jord är du kommen a book about the fictional character Rita Benson, and in 2017 a second book about Benson was released named Dödgrävarens dotter.

In July 2017, Christina Erikson signed a two-year book deal with Bonniers, the first book  Din Vän Forsete was released in September 2018.

Bibliography
 2014 – Morsarvet, Hoi Publishers
 2015 – En god gärning, Litet Publishers
 2015 – Av jord är du kommen(along with Thomas Erikson), Hoi Publishers
 2017 – Dödgrävarens dotter (along with Thomas Erikson), HarperCollins Nordic
 2018 – Din vän Forsete, Albert Bonniers Förlag
2019 – Ensamvarg'' Albert Bonniers Förlag

References

External links 

Living people
1973 births
21st-century Swedish novelists
Swedish crime fiction writers
Swedish women novelists
21st-century Swedish women writers
People from Kalmar Municipality
Writers from Småland
Women crime fiction writers